Steven Barnett Rosenberg (born 5 April 1968) is a British journalist for BBC News. He has been the BBC's Moscow correspondent almost continuously since 2003, except for a stint as Berlin correspondent between 2006 and 2010. In 2022 Rosenberg's role in Moscow was expanded and he was appointed the BBC's Russia editor.

Early life 
Steven Barnett Rosenberg was born on 5 April 1968 in Epping and grew up in Chingford, East London. He is Jewish. In 1894 his great-grandfather Haim Gnessin left the city of Shklow in the Russian Empire (present-day Belarus) on a passport Rosenberg still has. During his senior high school summer holidays, Rosenberg worked at the BBC's teletext service, Ceefax.

Following A-Levels at Chingford Senior High, he attended the University of Leeds. In 1991 he achieved a first in Russian Studies. After graduating, in August 1991 Rosenberg moved to Moscow and spent the next 15 years there, initially teaching English in the Moscow State Technological University STANKIN.

Career 
Rosenberg secured work with CBS News in the network's Moscow bureau. He spent the next six years at CBS, working first as a translator, then assistant producer, and then producer. Between 1994 and 1996 he was part of the CBS crew covering the first war in Chechnya.

In 1997 Rosenberg became a producer in the BBC's Moscow bureau. In 2000, he was appointed as a reporter for the BBC in Moscow. Three years later, he became its Moscow correspondent. Among the stories he covered in that period were the Kursk submarine disaster (2000), the Nord Ost theatre siege (2002) and the aftermath of the Beslan school attack (2004). In 2003 he interviewed Russian oligarch Roman Abramovich.

Between 2006 and 2010, Rosenberg was the BBC's Berlin correspondent, covering stories in Germany and across Europe. In 2010 he returned to Russia for a second stint as Moscow correspondent.

In 2014, Rosenberg and his film crew were attacked in Astrakhan by unidentified men after conducting an interview with the sister of a Russian soldier killed during the war in Donbas. The BBC filed an official complaint with the Russian authorities about the attack.

In 2015, the government of Ukraine issued a decree banning several journalists, including Rosenberg, from entering the country over his coverage of the war in Donbas. The decree stated those banned were a "threat to national interests" or engaged in promoting "terrorist activities". The BBC labelled the ban "a shameful attack on media freedom". The Ukrainians retracted the ban just a day later.

In 2018, Rosenberg was praised by other journalists for confronting Vladimir Putin with a question about the attempted assassination of Sergei and Yulia Skripal. Putin did not directly answer the question.

In November 2021 Rosenberg conducted a high-profile interview with Belarus president Alexander Lukashenko. During the interview he elicited the admission from Lukashenko that Belarusian troops "may have helped migrants into [the] EU".

On 10 March 2022, to strengthen the BBC's coverage of the Russian invasion of Ukraine, Rosenberg was appointed Russia editor of BBC News. This was an expansion of his role as Moscow correspondent.

Piano playing
He played a short excerpt from every Eurovision winning song, a medley lasting ten minutes. Later in the show, he took part in a 'Eurovision PopMaster', narrowly losing the competition to the author of The Eurovision Song Contest - The Official History, John Kennedy O'Connor.

In 2013, after an interview, Rosenberg played the piano at the request of Mikhail Gorbachev, the last leader of the Soviet Union. He played "Moscow Nights", which Gorbachev sang, followed by "Dark is the Night" and "The Misty Morning", a song he said was a favourite of his late wife Raisa. After his interview with Belarusian authoritarian leader Alexander Lukashenko, Rosenberg published his performance of "Kupalinka", a protest song associated with the 2020–2021 Belarusian protests.

In June 2020, during the COVID-19 pandemic, Rosenberg and BBC North West Tonight weather presenter and drummer Owain Wyn Evans came together to present the Match of the Day theme. Rosenberg went on to demonstrate more of his piano homages to Russian and English-speaking culture via the BBC with which he entertained people during the COVID-19 pandemic, many of which he posted on his Twitter feed.

In March 2022, he posted his piano piece "Isolation" on Twitter, saying, among other things, "It's how I'm feeling right now." On 12 March 2022, he posted the Ukrainian folk song "In the Grove by the Danube". On February 12, 2023 he posted his own composition, "Parallel Reality", to show how he feels about living in Russia under wartime state media.

References 

BBC people
British male journalists
1968 births
People from Epping
Living people
British people of Belarusian-Jewish descent
British expatriates in Russia
Alumni of the University of Leeds